is a former Nippon Professional Baseball pitcher.

External links

1957 births
Living people
Baseball people from Kōchi Prefecture
Meiji University alumni
Japanese baseball players
Nippon Professional Baseball pitchers
Yomiuri Giants players
Seibu Lions players
Japanese baseball coaches
Nippon Professional Baseball coaches